William Clarke Hauser was an American minister, medical doctor, teacher, composer, and music publisher.

Biography
He was born December 23, 1812 in Bethania, Forsyth County, North Carolina. He was the son of Martin Hauser and Leah Billiter.

William Hauser united with the Methodist Church in 1827 and was licensed to preach in 1834 and was a circuit riding preacher for two years. On March 23, 1837, he married Eliza M. Renshaw (1813-1880), and they had three children: Carolina Elizabeth Hauser Parker (1838-1926), William Clarke Hauser (1844-1919), and Victor McLandhton Hauser (1847-1919). William Hauser raised his family in New Orleans, LA and Victor Hauser did the same in Ogden, Utah. William Hauser attended Henry College in Virginia, beginning in 1839. After moving to Georgia in 1841, he began the study of medicine. He later taught at Oglethorpe Medical College in Savannah, GA.

Hauser died on September 18, 1880. His last words were ″I feel that my work on earth is done, and there is not a cloud between me and God.″ William and Eliza Hauser are buried on their plantation, Hesperia, near Wadley in Jefferson County, Georgia. According to a family member, "Hesperia Plantation was located on the southwestern corner of E. A. Goodson Road and Cooper Road Cooper Road changes its name to West Smith Street and ends on the east end at the Cheatham/Hauser (Wadley City) Cemetery in Wadley, Georgia."  The house is evidently no longer standing.

Music
Hauser made two significant contributions in the area of shape note music: (1) The Hesperian Harp: a Collection of Psalm and Hymn Tunes, Odes and Anthems, published in four shapes at Philadelphia by T. K. Collins, Jr. in 1848; and (2) Olive Leaf: A Collection of Beautiful Tunes, New and Old; the Whole of One or More Hymns Accompanying Each Tune, for the Glory of God, and the Good of Mankind, published in seven shapes at Wadley, Georgia, by Hauser and Benjamin Turner in 1878. The Hesperian Harp was probably the largest shape note tune book of its day, containing 552 pages of music, including 36 songs composed by Hauser. His Olive Leaf was produced in the seven shape notes of Jesse B. Aikin and contained only eight of his compositions from the older book. But his new compositions numbered forty-eight. Thirteen of his compositions are included in the Shenandoah Harmony (2013) in four shapes. The Moravian Music Foundation calls William Hauser "Appalachia's most significant contribution to American music."

References

Jackson, George Pullen. White Spirituals in the Southern Uplands: The Story of the Fasola Folk, Their Songs, Singings, and "Buckwheat Notes", Chapel Hill: University of North Carolina Press, Reprint, Dover Books, 1965.  This is an unaltered reprint in a smaller format and size of the original 1933 edition.
Scott, Joseph Dennie, The Tunebooks of William Hauser, D.M.A. thesis, New Orleans Baptist Theological Seminary, 1987.

External links
The Hesperian Harp by William Hauser (1848 ed.) This website contains images of the music portions of Hauser's major opus.
William Clarke Hauser (1812-1880) Cyberhymnal.org
Finding Aid for The Hauser Family Papers, 1837=1972 at The Southern Historical Collection, UNC, Chapel Hill, NC.

1812 births
1880 deaths
American male composers
Methodists from North Carolina
American music publishers (people)
Methodist circuit riders
Musicians from Georgia (U.S. state)
Musicians from North Carolina
People from Forsyth County, North Carolina
People from Wadley, Georgia
Shape note
19th-century Methodists
19th-century American composers
19th-century American male musicians
Methodists from Georgia (U.S. state)